Opao is a Trans–New Guinea language of Papua New Guinea.

References

Eleman languages
Languages of Gulf Province